Astragalus falcatus is a species of milkvetch known by the common names Russian milkvetch, sickle milkvetch, sicklepod milkvetch, and silverleaf milkvetch. It is a flowering plant found primarily in meadows and grasslands and sometimes in open woodlands.

Description
The plant has pure yellow, light yellow or creamy yellow flowers, sometimes tinged with purple. It grows 40 to 80 cm high with leaves 10 to 16 cm long which have between 8 and 20 pairs of narrow leaflets.

Uses
A. falcatus has been cultivated experimentally for dryland grazing in the US and possibly in France, and was proposed as a forage crop in the USSR. However, it is one of the milkweeds containing a poisonous glycoside identified as miserotoxin.

References

falcatus
Taxa named by Jean-Baptiste Lamarck